Łubianka, rural localities in Poland, may refer to:

Łubianka, Greater Poland Voivodeship (west-central Poland)
Łubianka, Kuyavian-Pomeranian Voivodeship (north-central Poland)
Łubianka, Masovian Voivodeship (east-central Poland)
Łubianka, Augustów County, in Podlaskie Voivodeship (north-east Poland)
Łubianka, Sokółka County, in Podlaskie Voivodeship (north-east Poland)
Łubianka, Pomeranian Voivodeship (north Poland)
Łubianka, West Pomeranian Voivodeship (north-west Poland)

See also
Lubianka (disambiguation)
Lubyanka (disambiguation)